Discosia artocreas is an ascomycete fungus that is a plant pathogen. 

In Iceland, it has been reported from the host species Alchemilla alpina, Betula pubescens, Geum rivale, Salix herbacea and Thalictrum alpinum.

In New Zealand, it has been reported as a host on Araucaria heterophylla  and Podocarpus totara .

References

External links 
 Index Fungorum
 USDA ARS Fungal Database

Fungal plant pathogens and diseases
Fungi of Iceland